Lunatics is an Australian comedy mockumentary streaming television series that premiered on Netflix on 19 April 2019. The ten-part series, written by and starring Chris Lilley, continues the mockumentary style of his previous series.

Synopsis
Lunatics is a mockumentary series that explores the lives and narrative of six different characters, all played by Lilley. Each character has his or her own eccentricity in terms of lifestyle and behaviour. The characters include fashion retailer Keith Dick; estate agent Quentin Cook; 7-foot college student Becky Douglas; 12-year old Gavin McGregor, who is an heir to an earldom; ex-pornstar Joyce Jeffries; and South African Jana Melhoopen-Jonks, a celebrity pet psychic who is also a lesbian.

A review notes that Lunatics follows Lilley's previous series, Summer Heights High, but the universe expanded past the school.

Cast and characters
There are six primary characters featured in Lunatics, all portrayed by Chris Lilley.

Keith Dick - a fashion wannabe who is in love with Karen, a cash register
Becky Douglas - a 7-foot-3 girl who has moved to California to attend college with her non-identical twin sister
Gavin McGregor - an obnoxious 12 year old destined to become the future earl of an English country estate
Jana Melhoopen-Jonks - a South African lesbian pet psychic to the stars
Quentin Cook - an incompetent real-estate agent who dreams of one day becoming a famous DJ and artist
Joyce Jeffries - a former adult film star who has become an extreme hoarder

Other characters
 Leena Arora as Patika Dick
Amanda Murphy as Marilyn 
 Anne McCaffery-French as Helen
 Philip Keogan as Ken
 Joe Murray as Dylan
 Harry Radbone as Oscar
 Millie Morice as Clementine
 Emma Wilson as Colleen 
 Ariana Doolan as Rashish
 Chloe Stout as Lucy 
 Dylan Gavasse as Jack
 Alyssa Macintosh as Sharnay 
 Cameron Leonard as Aaron
 Tracey McGown as Becky's Mum
 Darren McGown as Becky's Dad
 Katy Ferguson as Renee
 Evie Ferguson as Renee's 1st daughter
 Milly Ferguson as Renee's 2nd daughter
 Jessica Rockliff as Ingrid
 Bianca Daniels as Kylie
 Michelle Smit as Client
 Brock Thornburgh as Ethan
 Jett Thornburgh as Dustin
 Steve Minton as Brian
 Kim Kemp as Lyn
 Judi Young as Rhonda
 Antony Turrisi as Con
 Kane Sheehy as Harrison
 Min Suk Chin as Lingers(Tsun-Ling)
 Cassie Wang as Nancy

Episodes

Production

Development
In March 2018, it was announced that Lilley had been signed by Netflix to create a 10-part series. The series was filmed on the Gold Coast, Queensland.

Casting
Alongside the series order announcement, it was confirmed that Lilley would star in the lead role.

Release
On 11 April 2019, the official trailer for the series was released. The first season was released on Netflix on 19 April 2019.

References

External links
 
 

2019 Australian television series debuts
2010s Australian comedy television series
2010s LGBT-related comedy television series
2010s satirical television series
2010s Australian television miniseries
Australian LGBT-related television shows
Australian mockumentary television series
Australian satirical television shows
Cross-dressing in television
English-language Netflix original programming
Television series about brothers
Television series about dysfunctional families
Television series about twins
Television shows set in Australia